

The FMA IA.62 was a military trainer aircraft under development in Argentina in the late 1970s.

Development
It was developed by the Fabrica Militar de Aviones (FMA) in response to an Argentine Air Force request for a replacement for its Beech B-45 "Mentor" trainers then in service. The new aircraft was to combine its main role as a primary trainer with secondary roles as a reconnaissance and light attack aircraft.

The resulting design was for a low-wing cantilever monoplane with retractable tricycle undercarriage. The pilot and instructor were to sit in tandem under a long bubble canopy, and the Turbomeca Astazou turboprop was selected as a powerplant.

A scale model was displayed at the 1978 Paris Air Show, but the project was cancelled shortly afterwards.

Specifications (as designed)

References

Notes

Bibliography 
 
 
 

1970s Argentine military trainer aircraft
Abandoned military aircraft projects of Argentina
FMA aircraft